Golden Valley County is the name of two counties in the United States:

Golden Valley County, Montana
Golden Valley County, North Dakota